The 1987 World Table Tennis Championships – Corbillon Cup (women's team) was the 32nd edition of the women's team championship. 

China won the gold medal defeating South Korea in the final 3–0. Hungary won the bronze medal.

Medalists

Team

Second stage

Group A

Group B

Group C

Group D

Quarter finals

Semifinals

Third-place playoff

Final

See also
List of World Table Tennis Championships medalists

References

-
1987 in women's table tennis